The 1956 United States presidential election in Mississippi was held on November 6, 1956. Mississippi voters chose eight representatives, or electors to the Electoral College, who voted for president and vice president.

Ultimately Mississippi was to vote for Stevenson by a convincing margin of 33.76%, as the 1952 Eisenhower vote in the black belt was substantially turned over to the unpledged slate, whilst Stevenson held almost all of the vote he received in 1952. Mississippi was Stevenson's second-strongest state behind Georgia, and in terms of popular vote Eisenhower's weakest.

, 1956 would nonetheless remain the last election where a Democrat has gained a majority of the vote in Mississippi. The party's increasing embrace of civil rights for blacks would turn the state over to another unpledged slate in 1960, then overwhelmingly to the Republican nominee Barry Goldwater in 1964, who voted against the Civil Rights Act. With the enfranchisement of the state's blacks via the Voting Rights Act, the majority white population would overwhelmingly move toward the Republican Party. Since 1965 only Jimmy Carter in 1976 has carried Mississippi for the Democratic Party – and even Southern evangelical Carter's performance was his third-weakest in the extended South behind his narrow losses in Virginia and Oklahoma.

No Democratic presidential nominee has carried the following counties since Stevenson did so in this election: Lamar, Lauderdale, Lincoln, Lowndes, Newton, Rankin, Scott and Simpson. Stevenson is also the last Democrat to carry Clarke County outright, but Jimmy Carter and Ronald Reagan tied there with 3,303 votes apiece in 1980. Oktibbeha County would not vote Democratic again until Barack Obama carried it in 2008. This is also the last election in which the Democratic nominee carried Mississippi without winning the presidency.

Background
Ever since the end of Reconstruction, Mississippi had been a one-party state dominated by the Democratic Party. The Republican Party was virtually nonexistent as a result of disenfranchisement among African Americans and poor whites, including voter intimidation against those who refused to vote Democratic.

From the time of Henry A. Wallace's appointment as Vice-President and the 1943 Detroit race riots, however, the northern left wing of the Democratic Party became committed to restoring black political rights, a policy vehemently opposed by all Southern Democrats as an infringement upon "states' rights". Consequently, the four states with the highest proportions of (disenfranchised) African-Americans in the populations listed South Carolina Governor James Strom Thurmond instead of national Democratic nominee Harry S. Truman as the "Democratic" nominee in the 1948 Presidential election. Although Thurmond easily carried South Carolina, Mississippi, Alabama and Louisiana, Truman won the election.

Nevertheless, demands for civil rights legislation continued to intensify during the following eight years, although the pressing issue of the Korean War meant that Southern Democrats did not run a third-party ticket in 1952; however dissatisfaction with Democrat Adlai Stevenson on civil rights meant Dwight Eisenhower (listed as an "Independent" on the 1952 Mississippi ballot) gained considerable support from the exclusively white electorate of black belt counties, despite having a virtually identical position on civil rights.

After the landmark Brown v. Board of Education decision of 1954, however, Mississippi's rulers realized they could not rely on either major party to enforce segregation and white supremacy. The Citizens' Councils sought to map a regional caucus to deal with this issue, but it feared a split as had occurred in 1948. Nevertheless, the Citizens' Councils did place a slate of unpledged electors on the ballot alongside Eisenhower and Stevenson electors.

Results

Results by county

Notes

References

Mississippi
1956
1956 Mississippi elections